is a Japanese writer of mystery and thriller. He is a member of the Mystery Writers of Japan.

Awards and nominations
 2001 – Asahi Award for New Writers: Gansaku "Botchan" Satsujin Jiken (A "Botchan" Parody Murder Mystery)
 2007 – Nominee for Mystery Writers of Japan Award for Best Novel or Linked Short Stories: Tokyo Prison
 2009 – Mystery Writers of Japan Award for Best Novel or Linked Short Stories: Joker Game
 2009 – Yoshikawa Eiji Prize for New Writers: Joker Game
 2009 – Nominee for Haruhiko Oyabu Prize: Joker Game
 2014 – Nominee for Yamada Futaro Prize: Knight and Shadow

Bibliography

Joker Game series (aka D Agency series)

Each book includes three to six short stories.

, 2008
, 2009
, 2012
, 2015

Standalone novels
 , 2001 (The Golden Ash)
 , 2001 (A "Botchan" Parody Murder Mystery)
 , 2001 (Symposium: The Last Case of Socrates)
 , 2002 (The First Island)
 , 2003 (New World)
 , 2004 (Xavier's Head)
 , 2005 (I am Sherlock Holmes)
 , 2006 (Tokyo Prizon)
 , 2009 (Tiger and the Moon)
 , 2010 (Kind and Queen)
 , 2010 (The First Philosopher)
 , 2011 (Romance)
 , 2013 (Butterfly in Paradise)
 , 2014 (Knight and Shadow)
 , 2014 (The Wife of Socrates)

Short story collections
 , 2004 (Parthenon)
 , 2006 (Detective Seton Animal Chronicles)
 , 2007 (Marco The Million)
 , 2007 (The Case-Book of Soseki)
 , 2011 (Kaidan)

See also

Japanese detective fiction

References
 Profile at J'Lit Books from Japan  

1967 births
21st-century Japanese novelists
Japanese male short story writers
Japanese mystery writers
Japanese crime fiction writers
Mystery Writers of Japan Award winners
Living people
Writers from Mie Prefecture
21st-century Japanese short story writers
21st-century male writers